Dead Creek flows into the Seneca River by Baldwinsville, New York.

References

Rivers of Onondaga County, New York
Rivers of New York (state)